Black Eyes  is a 1936 Iranian romance film directed by Abdolhossein Sepanta and starring Fakhrozzaman Jabbar Vaziri, Abdolhossein Sepanta and Sohrab Pouri.

References

External links 
 

1936 films
Films directed by Abdolhossein Sepanta
1930s romance films
1930s Persian-language films
Iranian black-and-white films
Iranian romance films